Subedar Abdul Khaliq (Punjabi, ; 23 March 1933 – 10 March 1988), also known as Parinda e Asia (Urdu for The Flying Bird of Asia), was a Pakistani sprinter from 8 Medium Regiment Artillery who won 36 international gold medals, 15 international silver medals, and 12 International bronze medals for Pakistan. He competed in the 100m, 200m, and 4 x 100 meters relay. He participated in the 1956 Melbourne Olympics and the 1960 Rome Olympics. He also participated in the 1954 Asian Games and the 1958 Asian Games. During the 1956 Indo-Pak Meet held in Delhi, Abdul Khaliq was first referred to as "The Flying Bird of Asia" by the Prime Minister of India of the time, Jawaharlal Nehru, who was mesmerized by his performance during the event.

International career

1954

1954 Asian Games
In the 1954 Asian Games Abdul Khaliq set a new Asian Games record of 100 meters in 10.6 seconds by beating the previous record of 10.8 seconds, held by Lavy Pinto of India in 1951. Abdul Khaliq was dubbed as Fastest Man of Asia. Abdul Khaliq won Gold and Silver Medal from 100-meter and  relay race respectively in the 1954 Asian Games.

He also played in the World Military Games, held in Canada.

Commonwealth and British Empire Games
Abdul Khaliq was a 100-yard semi-finalist and a 4x110-yards finalist in the 1954 Commonwealth and British Games.

1955 

 Represented the World Military Games at Athens (Greece)

1956

Indo-Pak Meet at Delhi
Abdul Khaliq created new Asian records in both the 100- and 200-meter events. The Indian Prime Minister at the time, Jawaharlal Nehru, also chief guest, dubbed him "The Flying Bird of Asia" for his tremendous performance. 
Abdul Khaliq won the 100m dash by defeating Indian athlete V.K. Rai, winning the 100m Gold medal with a time of 10.4-second.
Abdul Khaliq triumphed in the 200m race and defeated Lavy Pinto of India and created a new record by clocking in 21.4 seconds.

World Military Games at Berlin
Abdul Khaliq Finished third in the final of the 100-meter, with 10.4 seconds, equal to his Delhi timing.
He won the 100-, 200-, and 4x100- meter bronze medals.

Pakistan Athletics Training Program in England
Abdul Khaliq defeated Britain Number 1 and Number 2, Shanton and Spooner, in both sprints. He won the 100-yard in 10.1 sec at an international meet in high land games on a turf track which was rendered wet due to incessant rains in the morning. Here, he defeated athletes from 15 countries in Europe. Some of the leading coaches described it as a very good performance and said it was equal to 9.5 sec on a cinder track.

Victorian Relay Championship
Abdul Khaliq ran a 100-meter race in 10.4 seconds, equaling the Australian National record at Olympic Park. Khaliq's was only one-tenth of a second outside of Bobby Morrow's Gold Medal in the Olympic Games' 100m final.  He won the 100m gold medal and the 4x100 yd gold medal.

Melbourne Olympics
In 1956, Abdul Khaliq was at his best. He was a semi-finalist in both 100m and 200m races. Khaliq's time in 200m race which is 21.1 seconds was the best time in heats but he could not produce the same in the semi-final and got 4th position. This performance of Khaliq's put him top seven athletes of the Olympics. It is compulsory to mentioned here that on 24 November 1956, the day of the semi-finals and the final of the 100m in the Olympics, Abdul Khaliq ran two hard races on the same day as "Anchor Man" for the winning Pakistan team in the 4x110-yard in the Victorian Relay Championship before tackling the 100m dash of the semi-final. With Khaliq running the last leg, the Pakistan team romped home 10 yards clear in the final clocking 41.6 seconds in the Victorian championship, which was one-tenth of a second outside of the national record held by the Australian Olympics team.

Final Standing in Melbourne Olympics

1957 
1957 was one of the best years for Abdul Khaliq. In this year Abdul Khaliq won 11 International Gold Medals and 1 International Silver Medal by participating in multiple events held by England, Iran, Greece, and Scotland.

1958 
Khaliq participated in the 3rd Asian Games held in Tokyo. He defended his title in the 100m race, by defeating Kyohei Ushio of Japan. Abdul Khaliq won 3 medals including Gold in the 100m race, Silver in the 200m race, and Bronze Medal from the  relay race in the 3rd Asian Games. With Khaliq's contributions, Pakistan secured 2nd position in Athletics and 6th in the overall rankings.

Abdul Khaliq also 3 more medals in 1958 by taking part in different events held in Japan, China, and Scotland. He also took part in British Empire and Commonwealth Games held at Cardiff and was a semi-finalist in 100-yards clocking at 9.8 seconds.

1959 
In 1959, Abdul Khaliq visited many countries like England, Sweden, Irish, Wales, Highland, Ireland and won 9 International Gold Medals, 7 International Silver Medal, and 4 International Bronze Medal by participated in many indifferent events held in multiple cities.

1960 
1960 Olympic Games
Abdul Khaliq took part in the 1960 Olympic Games held in Rome but he could not qualify for next rounds in both 100m and  relay race event.

International Meet at Lahore
This event in which Khaliq won Gold Medal in 100m race with a time of 10.4 seconds and Bronze Medal in 200m race and again Gold Medal in  relay race timing 41.5 seconds was picturized in the Indian movie Bhaag Milkha Bhaag.

1960 
In 1960, Abdul Khaliq lost against India's Milkha Singh held in Pakistan. After the race, General Ayub Khan of Pakistan, gave title to Milkha Singh as 'The Flying Sikh'.

Coaching career

Athletic coaches clinic attended
 1967 at Murree for 6 weeks under German Coach
 1974 at Hassan Abdal under USA Coaches
 1976 at Lahore under Russian Coaches
 1981 at Rawalpindi under I.O.C Coaches

Coaching 

 Army Coach 1965, 1966, 1967, 1970 & 1971
 Punjab 1974 & 1975
 National Coach 1974, 1975, 1976, 1977 & 1978
 Joined National Sports Trust Asian Athletics Coach 23 December 1975
 Punjab Sports Board Teachers Clinics
 National Coaches Clinic 1976
 Local PTI Clinic Lahore 1979

Achievements

International Medals (numbers as per events)

Presidential Award
Khaliq was given the Presidential Award Pride of Performance in 1958 by President Ayub Khan for his achievements.

Medals (international)

Running statistics

External links 
  Official Facebook page

References 

1933 births
1988 deaths
Asian Games gold medalists for Pakistan
Asian Games silver medalists for Pakistan
Asian Games bronze medalists for Pakistan
Asian Games medalists in athletics (track and field)
Athletes (track and field) at the 1954 Asian Games
Athletes (track and field) at the 1954 British Empire and Commonwealth Games
Athletes (track and field) at the 1956 Summer Olympics
Athletes (track and field) at the 1958 Asian Games
Athletes (track and field) at the 1958 British Empire and Commonwealth Games
Athletes (track and field) at the 1960 Summer Olympics
Athletes (track and field) at the 1962 Asian Games
Commonwealth Games competitors for Pakistan
Medalists at the 1954 Asian Games
Medalists at the 1958 Asian Games
Olympic athletes of Pakistan
Pakistan Navy personnel
Pakistani male sprinters
Pakistani prisoners of war in 1971
People from Chakwal District
Punjabi people
Recipients of the Pride of Performance award in 1958
Hashemite people
Alids
Awan
Alvis